The 43rd Golden Horse Awards (Mandarin:第43屆金馬獎) took place on November 25, 2006 at Taipei Arena in Taipei, Taiwan.

References

43rd
2006 film awards
2006 in Taiwan